Shaukat Usmani (Maulla Bux Usta) (1901–1978) was an early Indian communist, who was born to artistic USTA family of Bikaner and a member of the émigré Communist Party of India (Tashkent group), established in Tashkent in 1920, and a founding member of the Communist Party of India (CPI) formed in Kanpur in 1925.  He was also the only candidate to the British Parliament contesting elections, while he was residing in India—that too in a prison. He was sentenced to a total of 16 years in jail after being tried in the Kanpur (Cawnpore) Case of 1923 and later the Meerut Conspiracy Case of 1929.

In émigré Communist Party of India
M.N. Roy, an ex-member of the Anushilan Samiti,  a powerful secret revolutionary organization operating in East Bengal in the opening years of the 20th century, went to Moscow by the end of April 1920, and soon after founded the émigré Communist Party of India at Tashkent on 17 October 1920. The fledgling party became a part of Communist International (Comintern) in 1921. Usmani had been a very early leading activist of the émigré Communist Party of India.

M.N. Roy was sent by Lenin to Tashkent as head of Central Asiatic Bureau of Comintern as well as the Indian Military School to train an Indian army of revolutionaries. The Indian Military School was closed in April 1921, as a quid pro quo for industrial assistance that Britain promised to Soviet Russia, under Anglo-Russian Trade Pact in March 1921. But before its closure, the School indoctrinated many Muslim volunteers(muhajireens) who were on their way to Turkey to fight for the restoration of Caliphate. After the closing down of the School, the Comintern started Communist University of the Toilers of the East in Moscow. Usmani was one of the muhajireens who was tutored both at Moscow as well as at Tashkent.

Early in 1922 thirteen Indians belonging to the émigré Indian Communist Party crossed the Pamirs and reached India. They were all arrested and put in jail in Moscow-Peshawar conspiracy case. Usmani was not in this group, but a later batch, upon many of whom the British government clamped the Kanpur conspiracy case. The Tashkent-Moscow alumni who had dispersed all over the country did not have a smooth working relationship with the local leadership in India under S.A. Dange, Muzaffar Ahmed, S.S. Mirajkar, S.V. Ghate etc.

At the same time a different kind of tension was building up between the Communist Party of Great Britain and the émigré communists. As a result, four members of the émigré CPI, including Usmani, went to attend the sixth congress of Comintern without seeking émigré Communist Party of India's nomination. All these tensions did not come into open because of the strict police surveillance. By this stage, Usmani was operating underground under the nom de guerre of Sikander Sur; his Comintern code name was D A Naoroji (sometimes wrongly rendered as Naoradji).

Kanpur conspiracy case

After Peshawar in 1922, two more conspiracy cases were instituted by the British government, one in Kanpur (1924) and Meerut (1929). The accused in the cases included, among others, important Communist organisers who worked in India, such as S.A. Dange, Muzaffar Ahmad, Nalini Gupta and S.V. Ghate, and members of the émigré party, such as Rafiq Ahmad and Shaukat Usmani.

On 17 March 1924, M.N. Roy, S.A. Dange, Muzaffar Ahmed, Nalini Gupta, Shaukat Usmani, Singaravelu Chettiar, Ghulam Hussain and others were charged that they as communists were seeking "to deprive the King Emperor of his sovereignty of British India, by complete separation of India from imperialistic Britain by a violent revolution.", in what was called the Cawnpore (now spelt Kanpur) Bolshevik Conspiracy case.

The case attracted interest of the people towards Comintern plan to bring about violent revolution in India. "Pages of newspapers daily splashed sensational communist plans and people for the first time learned such a large scale about communism and its doctrines and the aims of the Communist International in India."

Singaravelu Chettiar was released on account of illness. M.N. Roy was out of the country and therefore could not be arrested. Ghulam Hussain confessed that he had received money from the Russians in Kabul and was pardoned. Muzaffar Ahmed, Shaukat Usmani and Dange were sentenced for four years of imprisonment. This case was responsible for actively introducing communism to the Indian masses.

After Kanpur, Britain had triumphantly declared that the case had "finished off the communists". But the industrial town of Kanpur, in December 1925, witnessed a conference of different communist groups, under the chairmanship of Singaravelu Chettiar. Dange, Muzaffar Ahmed, Nalini Gupta, Shaukat Usmani were among the key organizers of the meeting. The meeting adopted a resolution for the formation of the Communist Party of India with its headquarters in Bombay (now: Mumbai) . The British Government's extreme hostility  towards the bolsheviks, made them to decide not to openly function as a communist party; instead, they chose a more open and non-federated platform, under the name the Workers and Peasants Parties.

Meerut conspiracy case

The British Government was worried about the growing influence of the Communist International in India. The government's immediate response was to foist yet another conspiracy case—the Meerut Conspiracy Case—on them. Usmani along with 32 persons were arrested on or about March 20, 1929  and were put on trial under Section 121A of the Indian Penal Code, which declares, Whoever within or without British India conspires to commit any of the offenses punishable by Section 121 or to deprive the King of the sovereignty of British India or any part thereof, or conspires to overawe, by means of criminal force or the show of criminal force, the Government of India or any local Government, shall be punished with transportation for life, or any shorter term, or with imprisonment of either description which may extend to ten years.

The charges
Though all the accused were not communists, the charges framed against them betrayed the government's fear of growth of communist ideas in India. "For example, Lester Hutchinson, later released as innocent after spending four years in prison, was arrested as an afterthought when he took up the task of carrying on some of the trade union and agitational work after the arrest of the others, was a merely journalist on the Indian Daily Mail and unconnected with the trade union movement."

The main charges were that in 1921 Dange, Shaukat Usmani and Muzaffar Ahmad entered into a conspiracy to establish a branch of Comintern in India and they were helped by various persons, including the accused Philip Spratt and Benjamin Francis Bradley, sent to India by the Communist International.

The Sessions Court in Meerut awarded stringent sentences to the accused in January 1933. Out of the accused 27 persons were convicted with various durations of 'transportation'. While Muzaffar Ahmed was transported for life, Dange, Spratt, Ghate, Joglekar and Nimbkar were each awarded transportation for a period of 12 years. Usmani was given ten years. On appeal, in July 1933, the sentences of Ahmed, Dange and Usmani were reduced three years. Reductions were also made in the sentences of other convicts.

Communist candidate from Spen Valley
During Meerut trial Usmani stood unsuccessfully as a candidate in a British general election for the Communist Party of Great Britain from his prison cell in India, for the  1929 general election for the constituency of Spen Valley. Usmani is believed to be the only candidate ever to stand in a British General Election whilst resident in India. The Spen Valley seat was significant since it was the focus of an attempt by the leader of a pro-Tory group of right-leaning Liberals, Sir John Simon, to get back into Parliament. He had been the man who declared in 1926 that the General Strike was illegal, and who in 1930 headed the Commission to report on the situation in India.

Usmani’s selection as candidate arose from his prominence in the Meerut trial. Since he was a prisoner thousands of miles away, he was unable to conduct the campaign himself, so a deputy to represent him was chosen - one Billy Brain. Communists from many parts of Britain converged at Spen Valley. The  campaign was successful in the sense  that it brought into focus Meerut and harshness of British rule in  India, which were hitherto unknown to many.

Candidate from South East St Pancras
The long drawn Meerut trial enabled the Communist Party to again run Usmani in the 1931 general election for St. Pancras South East against  Tory South African mining millionaire, Sir Alfred Lane Beit. The candidature of Usmani was aimed by the Communist Party of Great Britain to ensure freedom for India, and to highlight the plight of the Meerut prisoners. In this election, the communists polled seventy five thousand votes, which was a 50% increase on the previous, 1929 General election figure. The party was dismayed at the result. Harry Pollitt, the new general secretary of the Party, had expected that between one hundred and fifty thousand and two hundred thousand would vote communist. He was shocked, and told a meeting of the British Commission of the Communist International that he could not understand why after two Labour Governments, and the betrayal of the General Strike, that still almost seven million workers could vote Labour.

Later life
Aftermath of the Meerut case was the emergence of a stronger CPI, instead of what the British planned for—obliteration of the party. After the release of the Meerut prisoners, in 1933, a party with a centralized apparatus came into being. The CPI came out with its own manifesto and was affiliated to the Communist International in 1934 However, Usmani did not figure in  the Party building exercise. The leadership had gone to local (as opposed to  émigré Tashkent-Moscow cadre) communists like S.A. Dange, P.C. Joshi, P. Sundarayya etc. Nothing much had been heard about Usmani after release from the jail.

Similar fate happened to other members of  the émigré CPI. Muhammad Ali Sepassi, M.N. Roy's close aide stayed back in Paris and was shot dead by the Nazis in 1940. Muhammed Shafique, first secretary of  émigré CPI, wandered about in Europe until 1932 and then vanished. Abdulla Safdar came to India only in 1933 when most of the comrades were booked under the Meerut case. He remained with M.N. Roy, who had by then, had only little standing in the international communist movement. G.A.K. Lohani who had joined Roy in 1921 never returned to India. Like other émigré CPI members, Usmani also slipped into oblivion.

After release from
Meerut, Usmani worked
in BB&CI Railway Work-
ers’ Union, was arrested
on July 14, 1940 in Agra,
shifted to Deoli Camp,
then to Bareilly,
Fatehgarh etc, being re-
leased on January 8, 1945.
He became general sec-
retary of National
Seafarers’ Union in
Bombay during RIN revolt of 1946. He was not allowed
to return to India, so went
to London in September,
1952 but returned to
Bombay after 72 days.
Working as a firm man-
ager, he left again for
London in 1955 and be-
gan research work
regularly in British Museum Library, doing odd
jobs.

Usmani joined British Labor Party and its executive. He used its platform to propagate
the cause of Goa liberation struggle. Simultaneously, he continued
his research till 1961, resulting in the book
‘Nutritive Values of
Fruits, Vegetables, Nuts
and Food Cures’, a
widely appreciated
work. He rejected offers
of British citizenship and
returned to India in 1962.
He then shifted to Cairo,
Egypt, in 1964 and re-
mained there till 1974,
working as journalist in
Egyptian Gazette, Lotus
of AAPSO etc. He also
worked in Al Fatah of
PLO.

Upon return to India
in 1974, Usmani joined
the CPI. He worked for
some time with Dr
Adhikari in Ajoy Bhavan,
his co-prisoner in
Meerut. He went to
Bikaner at the request of
CPI comrades there in
1976 to celebrate his 75th
birth anniversary. He
had left Bikaner in 1920.
Shaukat Usmani died on
February 26, 1978. His
son and other family
members lived in ex-
treme penury.

Books
Peshawar to Moscow Leaves from an Indian Muhajireen's diary, Shaukat Usmani's earliest book was published by Swarajya Publishing House, Benares in 1927. Much later in life, Usmani published a book on the same theme, Historic Trips of a Revolutionary - Sojourn in the Soviet Union. The book gives an account of Usmai's part in the émigré Communist Party of India, and other examples of progress in his homeland like the Indian Military School. He gives colorful descriptions of his stays in Moscow, during which he lodges at the Hotel Delovoi Dior (which has a meaning something akin to the “Business Courtyard”), and boards at the Hotel De Lux, once a gathering place for Communist leaders from all over the world. He also describes a trip from Tashkent through the Ukraine to Crimea. This book is focused mainly on the Middle Eastern states of the Soviet Union.

Usmani published in 1939 Char Yatri in Hindi and Char Musafir in Urdu and later in English as Four Travellers. It is an account of a journey of four Indian revolutionaries through Jagdalak, Kabul, Mazar-i-Sharif, Termiz, Bukhara and Samarkand. He had also published a collection of eight stories in 1951 called Night of the eclipse; a collection of 8 short stories. Karachi: Usta Publications Corp.

See also
S.A. Dange
M.N. Roy

Notes

External links 
Stevenson, Graham, Shaukat (pron. Shavkat) Usmani. Compendium of Communist Biographies.
He fought to be British MP while in Indian jail

1901 births
1978 deaths
Indian communists
Communist Party of Great Britain members
Comintern people
People from Bikaner
20th-century Indian Muslims
Indian expatriates in the Soviet Union
Communist Party of India politicians from Rajasthan
Prisoners and detainees of British India